The Left! is a Bulgarian centre-left to left-wing political coalition established on 12 February 2023.

Ideology 
According to the Stand Up.BG leader Maya Manolova, the political crisis can be overcome with a united and strong left. According to Manolova, The Left positions itself as an alternative to the right "pole of war" (represented by GERB–SDS and PP–DB) and opposes sending weapons to Ukraine, supporting the course of President Rumen Radev.

The new coalition will prioritize incomes, prices, countering monopolies and corruption. The union will insist on an increase in the minimum wage and that there are no Bulgarians below the poverty line.

According to members of the coalition, it was created to consolidate the voices of the left forces, "so that they do not have to vote for other political formations just because, until recently, the ruling party of the left does not correspond to their ideas of how the left should look in Bulgaria."

The coalition criticizes the Bulgarian Socialist Party of Korneliya Ninova, saying that the BSP is "not able to raise the flag of the left" and has stopped dealing with important issues, become only concerned with itself, and that the way out of this will be a change in the leadership of the party. One day before coalition formation, 11 February, the BSP congress was held, at which Korneliya Ninova was re-elected and part of her opponents were expelled from the party. According to The Left, Ninova refused to join coalition talks.

History 
On 12 February 2023, after a four-month dialogue, the creation of the Levitsata! coalition was announced. The coalition has announced that it will take part in the 2023 snap parliamentary election and is now in the process of registering for the election.

On 13 February, the coalition submitted 6,000 signatures to register for the upcoming election.

On the 3d of March, the list opened its campaign for the 2023 elections outside the coal power plant "Maritsa Istok 2" located in Stara Zagora oblast, with the list promising to bring up the issues of "ordinary Bulgarian citizens" in the next parliament.

Coalition members

References

2023 establishments in Bulgaria
Centre-left parties in Europe
Left-wing political party alliances
Political parties established in 2023
Political party alliances in Bulgaria
Social democratic parties in Bulgaria